X/OS was a Unix from the computer manufacturer Olivetti. It was based on 4.2BSD with some UNIX System V support. It ran on their LSX line of computers, which was based on the Motorola 68000-series CPUs.

Unix variants